Cerbu ("stag, deer") may refer to several villages in Romania:

 Cerbu, a village in Bucium Commune, Alba County
 Cerbu, a village in Albota Commune, Argeș County
 Cerbu, a village in Copălău Commune, Botoşani County
 Cerbu, a village in Topolog Commune, Tulcea County
 Cerbu, a village in Jitia Commune, Vrancea County

See also 
 Cerbu River (disambiguation)
 The Golden Stag Festival, called Cerbul de Aur in Romanian